Currys, also known as Lenora, is an unincorporated community in Montgomery County, Alabama, United States. A post office operated under the name Lenora from 1892 to 1905.

References

Unincorporated communities in Montgomery County, Alabama
Unincorporated communities in Alabama